Davidson Hall, Coker University, also known as the Administration Building, is a historic educational building located on the campus of Coker University at Hartsville, Darlington County, South Carolina.  It was built in 1909–1910, and is a two-story, 15-bay, rectangular brick building with Neo-Classical details. It has a hip roof and a projecting semicircular auditorium on the rear elevation. The front façade features a projecting, two-story, pedimented portico, supported by six stuccoed Ionic order columns.  It was built with funds donated by the college's founder, Major James Lide Coker, and was the first building constructed for Coker University.

It was listed on the National Register of Historic Places in 1983.

References

University and college buildings on the National Register of Historic Places in South Carolina
Neoclassical architecture in South Carolina
Buildings and structures completed in 1910
Buildings and structures in Hartsville, South Carolina
National Register of Historic Places in Darlington County, South Carolina
1910 establishments in South Carolina